Mary Lorson is an American writer, musician and composer. Best known for her time as the lead singer of alternative pop groups Madder Rose and Saint Low, Lorson has gone on to release albums with The Piano Creeps and Mary Lorson & the Soubrettes. She lives in Ithaca, New York.

Biography
Lorson was born and raised in the suburbs of New York City and formed Madder Rose with Billy Coté in 1991 in Greenwich Village. When Madder Rose disbanded in 1999 she founded Saint Low with bassist Stahl Caso, violinist Joe Myer, pianist Michael Stark, vocalist Jennie Stearns, and drummer Zaun Marshburn. Lorson and Coté toured with Tanya Donelly from 1996-7.

Lorson and Coté have collaborated on film scores including the original score for "What Remains: The Life and Art of Sally Mann" for Steven Cantor and HBO. She and Coté have a son, Roman. A breast cancer survivor and high school English teacher, Lorson is the author of "Freak Baby and the Kill Thought," an original screenplay about the life of vaudeville singer and actress Eva Tanguay. The album "BurnBabyBurn," released by Mary Lorson & the Soubrettes in 2011, features a version of Tanguay's 1922 song "I Don't Care."

Lorson's projects also have included developing a television series, "Old School"; scoring the independent web series "The Chanticleer"; a multimedia performance memoir, "Signal"; and setting a chapter of James Joyce's Finnegans Wake to music, for the Waywords and Meansigns project. Her 11th full-length album, "Themes From Whatever," was released in November 2017.

Discography

Mary Brett Lorson 
Themes from Whatever, 2017

Mary Lorson & the Soubrettes 
BurnBabyBurn, 2011

The Piano Creeps
 Future Blues (for me and you), 2008

Mary Lorson & Saint Low
 Realistic, 2006
 Tricks for Dawn, 2002
 Saint Low, 2000

With Billy Coté
 What Remains, original score, 2007
 Barrier Device, original score, 2004
 Two Left Shoes, original score, 2003
 Piano Creeps, 2003

Madder Rose
 Bring It Down, 1993
 Panic On, 1994
 The Love You Save (EP), 1995
 Tragic Magic, 1997
 Hello June Fool, 1999

External links
Official Mary Lorson webpage

References

American women singer-songwriters
American singer-songwriters
Living people
Year of birth missing (living people)